Espino may refer to:

Plants
Crataegus monogyna, native to Europe, Africa and Asia
Acacia caven, native to mainland South America

People
Alfredo Espino (1900—1928), El Salvadoran poet
Amado Espino, Jr., Governor of the Philippine Province of Pangasinan
Benito Espinós (1748–1818), Spanish painter
Damaso Espino (born 1983), Panamanian baseball player
Dennis Espino (born 1973), Filipino basketball player
Gaby Espino (born 1977), Venezuelan actress and model
Héctor Espino (1939–1997), Mexican baseball player
Juan Espino (born 1956), Dominican baseball player
Martin Espino, Mexican-American musician and composer
Miguel Angel Espino (1902–1967), El Salvadoran writer, journalist and lawyer
Miguel Espino (born 1980), American boxer
Nelson Moliné Espino, Cuban dissident and prisoner of conscience
Paolo Espino (born 1987), Panamanian baseball player

Municipalities and places
Alto del Espino, a town in the Panamá province of Panama
El Espino, Spain, a village in the municipality of Suellacabras, Soria province, Spain
El Espino, Boyacá, a municipality in the Colombian Department of Boyacá
El Espino de Santa Rosa, a town in the Veraguas province of Panama
Espino de la Orbada, a village and municipality in the province of Salamanca, western Spain
Hoyos del Espino, a municipality located in the province of Ávila, Castile and León, Spain
Espino, Añasco, Puerto Rico, a barrio
Espino, Lares, Puerto Rico, a barrio
Espino, Las Marías, Puerto Rico, a barrio 
Espino, San Lorenzo, Puerto Rico, a barrio

Stadiums
Estadio Cerro del Espino, a multi-use stadium located in Majadahonda, Community of Madrid, Spain
Estadio de Béisbol Héctor Espino, a baseball stadium in Hermosillo, Mexico named for Héctor Espino

See also
 Espinillo (disambiguation)
 El Espino (disambiguation)